Graeme Beissel (born 25 August 1941) is a former Australian rules footballer who played with Essendon in the VFL during the 1960s. 

Beissel made his debut for Essendon in 1961 and played as a centreman in Essendon's 32 point 1962 Grand Final victory over Carlton.

External links 
 

1941 births
Australian rules footballers from Victoria (Australia)
Essendon Football Club players
Essendon Football Club Premiership players
Living people
One-time VFL/AFL Premiership players